Hajjiabad-e Yarahmadi (also Romanized as Ḩājjīābād-e Yāraḩmadī; also known as Ḩājjīābād and Hājīābād) is a village in Chalanchulan Rural District, Silakhor District, Dorud County, Lorestan Province, Iran. At the 2006 census, its population was 476, in 122 families.

References 

Towns and villages in Dorud County